Lucius Nonius Calpurnius Torquatus Asprenas (fl. 1st century – 2nd century AD) was a Roman senator who achieved the office of consul ordinarius twice, first under Domitian and later under Hadrian.

Biography
Torquatus Asprenas was the son of Lucius Nonius Calpurnius Torquatus Asprenas, who was a suffect consul between AD 72 and 74, and Arria. His sister was Calpurnia Arria (also referred to as Arria Calpurnia), who married Gaius Bellicus Natalis Tebanianus, suffect consul in 87.

An Augur, he was elected consul in AD 94, with Titus Sextius Magius Lateranus as his colleague. From 107 to 108, Torquatus Asprenas was appointed the Proconsular governor of Asia. He was appointed consul for a second time, in AD 128, when the consul designate Publius Metilus Nepos died before assuming office; Marcus Annius Libo was the colleague. 

An inscription recovered in Athens attests that Asprenas had a daughter Torquata; she married Lucius Pomponius Bassus, consul in 118.

Notes

Sources
 PIR ² N 133

1st-century Romans
2nd-century Romans
Calpurnii
Asprenas, Lucius Calpurnius Torquatus
Imperial Roman consuls
Roman governors of Asia
Augurs of the Roman Empire
Year of birth unknown
Year of death unknown